Rev. Plummer T. Hall House, also known as the Hall-Jackson House, is a historic home located near Raleigh, Wake County, North Carolina.  It was built between 1880 and 1893, and is a one-story, Queen Anne-style frame cottage. An office or study addition was built about 1900.  It was the home of a locally prominent African-American family.

It was listed on the National Register of Historic Places in 2002.

References

African-American history of North Carolina
Houses on the National Register of Historic Places in North Carolina
Queen Anne architecture in North Carolina
Houses completed in 1893
Houses in Wake County, North Carolina
National Register of Historic Places in Wake County, North Carolina